Jordi Domenjó (born 1979) is a Spanish slalom canoeist who competed at the international level from 1995 to 2015.

He won two bronze medals at the ICF Canoe Slalom World Championships. One in the C1 event (2010) and the other one in the C1 team event (2009). He also won a bronze medal in the C1 team event at the 2000 European Championships in Mezzana.

World Cup individual podiums

References

2010 ICF Canoe Slalom World Championships 12 September 2010 C1 men's final results. - accessed 12 September 2010.
12 September 2009 final results of the men's C1 team slalom event for the 2009 ICF Canoe Slalom World Championships. - accessed 12 September 2009.

Living people
Spanish male canoeists
1979 births
Medalists at the ICF Canoe Slalom World Championships
21st-century Spanish people